Almost Gold Recordings is an independent record label. It was founded in 2007 in New York City by Scott Rodger of Quest Management with distribution in North America through Columbia Records. The first release on Almost Gold was the Peter Bjorn and John album Writer's Block, on February 6, 2007. Almost Gold is now fully independent in North America having severed ties with Columbia Records.

Almost Gold Recordings is a partnership between Scott Rodger and Clare Britt (formerly of Rough Trade and Island Records), with distribution Worldwide through Mercury Records. The first release on Almost Gold in the UK and internationally was Black Kids' debut album Partie Traumatic in July 2008. Other notable acts include Calvin Harris and Does It Offend You, Yeah?

Artists

North America 
 Calvin Harris
 Does It Offend You, Yeah?
 Peter Bjorn and John
 Shugo Tokumaru
 Walter Meego
 Wild Light

UK 
 Black Kids
 Harlem Shakes

See also 
 List of record labels

References

External links
 Official site

Record labels established in 2007
Indie rock record labels
Alternative rock record labels
American independent record labels
British independent record labels